Ida of Boulogne may refer to:
 Ida of Lorraine, Countess of Boulogne (c. 1040 – 1113), daughter of Godfrey III, Duke of Lower Lorraine; wife of Eustace II, Count of Boulogne
 Ida, Countess of Boulogne (c. 1160 – 1216), daughter of Matthew of Alsace and Marie, Countess of Boulogne